The Chevron B12 is a lightweight sports racing car, designed, developed and built by British manufacturer Chevron Cars, in 1968, and was essentially a modified (lengthened) version of their B8 model.

References

Chevron racing cars
Sports prototypes
24 Hours of Le Mans race cars
Group 4 (racing) cars
Sports racing cars